Ptilothyris nemophorella is a moth in the family Lecithoceridae. It was described by Jean Ghesquière in 1940. It is found in the former province of Équateur in the Democratic Republic of the Congo.

References

Moths described in 1940
Ptilothyris
Taxa named by Edward Meyrick
Endemic fauna of the Democratic Republic of the Congo